Laura Duryea (born 14 December 1983), previously known as Laura Corrigan and also referred to as Laura Corrigan Duryea, is a women's Australian rules footballer best known for her professional career with  in the AFLW and for representing Ireland multiple times in the Australian Football International Cup. 

She originally played senior ladies' Gaelic football for Cavan and Victoria however decided to switch preferring the increased physicality of Australian Football, and wore the number at Melbourne of the late Irish Hall of Famer Jim Stynes.

Early years, family and education
Duryea is originally from Ireland. She was raised in the Drumlane, Belturbet and Milltown area of County Cavan. She is the daughter of Ian Corrigan, an Irish country singer. Her father and brothers played Gaelic football for Drumlane. She was educated at Loreto College, Cavan and RMIT. 

In 2008 Duryea arrived in St Kilda, Victoria while travelling. She ended up staying in the Melbourne area and eventually settled in Rosebud, Mornington Peninsula. In 2016 she married Richard Duryea.

Gaelic football

Clubs
While living in County Cavan, Duryea played for Drumlane and Erne Gaels. After moving to Melbourne she played for Sinn Féin.

Inter-county
Duryea has also played senior ladies' Gaelic football for Cavan and Victoria. In 2006 Duryea played for a representative team known as the Underdogs while participating in the TG4 reality show of the same name. During the show, the Underdogs played against Meath, Laois and Cork.

Australian rules football

VWFL
In 2008 while playing ladies' Gaelic football at Gaelic Park in Keysborough, an opponent suggested Duryea should try women's Australian rules football and invited her to a training session with the VWFL team, Melbourne University. After a season with Melbourne University, Duryea switched to Diamond Creek. She subsequently played for Diamond Creek in seven VWFL Premier Division grand finals, helping them win the 2012 VFWL Premiership Cup.

Melbourne
On 5 February 2017 she made her AFLW debut against  at Casey Fields. Duryea and Staunton were the first and second Irish players to feature in the AFLW.

Ireland
Duryea has played for Ireland in the 
Australian Football International Cup, helping Ireland win the cup in both 2011 and 2017.

Teacher
Duryea is a primary school teacher. She taught PE in Dublin before emigrating to Australia. She has worked as teacher at Montmorency South Primary School and Dromana Primary School.

Honours

Diamond Creek
VFWL Premiership Cup
Winners: 2012: 1
Runner up: ???   : 6
Ireland
Australian Football International Cup
Winners: 2011, 2017: 2
Runner up: 2014: 1
Womens World Team selection: 2011, 2014, 2017

References

1983 births
Living people
Melbourne Football Club (AFLW) players
Melbourne University Football Club (VFLW) players
Cavan ladies' Gaelic footballers
Irish female players of Australian rules football
Ladies' Gaelic footballers who switched code
Irish expatriate sportspeople in Australia
Irish schoolteachers
RMIT University alumni
Participants in Irish reality television series
People from Mornington Peninsula
Australian rules footballers from Melbourne
Irish emigrants to Australia
Australian schoolteachers